Sand Creek is an unincorporated community in western Grant County, Oklahoma, United States. The stream Sand Creek flows past the east side of the community.

References

Unincorporated communities in Grant County, Oklahoma
Unincorporated communities in Oklahoma